John George Haigh (24 July 1909 – 10 August 1949), commonly known as the Acid Bath Murderer, was an English serial killer convicted for the murder of six people, although he claimed to have killed nine. Haigh battered to death or shot his victims and disposed of their bodies using sulphuric acid before forging their signatures so he could sell their possessions and collect large sums of money. His actions were the subject of the television film A Is for Acid.

Early life 
John Haigh was born in Stamford, Lincolnshire, and raised in the village of Outwood, West Riding of Yorkshire. His parents were engineer John Robert Haigh and his wife Emily (née Hudson), members of the Plymouth Brethren, a conservative Protestant sect.

Haigh later claimed that he suffered from recurring religious nightmares in his childhood. He developed great proficiency at the piano, which he learned at home. He was fond of classical music and often attended concerts.

Haigh won a scholarship to Queen Elizabeth Grammar School, Wakefield, then to Wakefield Cathedral, where he became a choirboy. After school, he was apprenticed to a firm of motor engineers. After a year, he left that job and took jobs in insurance and advertising. Aged 21, he was dismissed after being suspected of stealing from a cash box. After being fired he moved on to forging car documents.

Marriage and imprisonment 
On 6 July 1934, Haigh married 23-year-old Beatrice 'Betty' Hamer. The marriage soon disintegrated. The same year that Haigh was jailed for fraud, Betty gave birth while he was in prison, and she placed the baby girl for adoption and left Haigh. Haigh's conservative family ostracised him from then onwards.

Haigh moved to London in 1936, and became chauffeur to William McSwan, a wealthy owner of amusement arcades. He also maintained McSwan's amusement machines. Thereafter he pretended to be a solicitor named William Cato Adamson with offices in Chancery Lane, London; Guildford, Surrey; and Hastings, Sussex. He sold fraudulent stock shares, purportedly from the estates of his deceased clients, at below-market rates. His scam was uncovered by someone who noticed he had misspelled Guildford as "Guilford" on his letterhead. Haigh received a four-year prison sentence for fraud. Haigh was released just after the start of the Second World War; he continued as a fraudster and was sentenced to several further terms of imprisonment.

Regretting that he had left victims alive to accuse him, he became intrigued by French murderer Georges-Alexandre Sarret, who had disposed of bodies using sulphuric acid. Haigh experimented with field mice and found that it took only 30 minutes for the body to dissolve.

"Acid bath" murders
Haigh was freed from prison in 1943 and became an accountant with an engineering firm. Soon after, by chance, he bumped into his former employer William McSwan in a Kensington pub. McSwan introduced Haigh to his parents, Donald and Amy. McSwan worked for them by collecting rents on their London properties, and Haigh became envious of his lifestyle. On 6 September 1944, McSwan disappeared. Haigh later admitted he had lured McSwan into a basement on Gloucester Road, hit him over the head with a lead pipe, and then put his body in a  drum with concentrated sulphuric acid. Two days later, finding that McSwan's body had mostly dissolved, Haigh emptied the drum into a manhole.

He told McSwan's parents that their son had gone into hiding in Scotland to avoid being called up for military service. Haigh then began living in McSwan's house and collecting rent for McSwan's parents. They became curious as to why their son had not returned, as the war was coming to an end. On 2 July 1945, he lured them to Gloucester Road by telling them their son was back from Scotland for a surprise visit. There he killed them with blows to the head and disposed of them. Haigh then stole McSwan's pension cheques and sold his parents' properties, for around £8,000, and moved into the Onslow Court Hotel in Kensington.

Haigh was a gambler. By 1947, he was running short of money. To solve his financial troubles, he found another couple to kill and rob: Archibald Henderson and his wife Rose. After feigning interest in a house that they were selling, he was invited to the Hendersons' flat by Rose to play the piano for their housewarming party. While at the flat, Haigh stole Archibald Henderson's revolver, planning to use it in his next crime. Renting a small workshop at 2 Leopold Road, Crawley, West Sussex, he moved acid and drums there from Gloucester Road. (Haigh was also known to have stayed at Crawley's Hotel, The George, on several occasions.) On 12 February 1948, he drove Archibald Henderson to his workshop on the pretext of showing him an invention. When they arrived, Haigh shot Henderson in the head with the stolen revolver. Haigh then lured Rose Henderson to the workshop, claiming that her husband had fallen ill, and he shot her as well.

After disposing of the Hendersons' bodies in oil drums filled with acid, he forged a letter with their signatures and sold all of their possessions for £8,000, except for their car and dog, which he kept.

Last victim and capture 
Haigh's next and last victim was Olive Durand-Deacon, 69, the wealthy widow of solicitor John Durand-Deacon and a fellow resident at the Onslow Court Hotel. Haigh by then was calling himself an engineer, and Olive mentioned an idea to him that she had for artificial fingernails. He invited her down to the Leopold Road workshop on 18 February 1949 and, once inside, he shot her in the back of the neck with the .38 caliber Webley revolver that he had stolen from Archibald Henderson, stripped her of her valuables, including a Persian lamb coat, and put her into the acid bath. Two days later, Durand-Deacon’s friend Constance Lane reported her missing.

Detectives soon discovered Haigh’s record of theft and fraud and searched the workshop. Police found Haigh’s attaché case containing a dry cleaner’s receipt for Olive Durand-Deacon’s coat, and also papers referring to the Hendersons and McSwans. The workshop in Sussex rented by Haigh did not contain a floor drain, unlike the workshop he had rented at Gloucester Road in London. He, therefore, disposed of the remains by pouring out the container on a rubble pile at the back of the property. Investigation of the area by pathologist Keith Simpson revealed 28 pounds of human body fat, part of a human foot, human gallstones and part of a denture which was later identified by Olive Durand-Deacon's dentist during the trial.

Haigh asked Detective Inspector Albert Webb during questioning, "Tell me, frankly, what are the chances of anybody being released from Broadmoor?" (a high-security psychiatric hospital). The inspector said that he could not discuss that sort of thing, so Haigh replied, "Well if I told you the truth, you would not believe me. It sounds too fantastic to believe."

Haigh then confessed that he had killed Durand-Deacon, the McSwans, and the Hendersons—as well as three other people: a young man called Max, a girl from Eastbourne, and a woman from Hammersmith. These claims could not be substantiated.

Trial and execution 
Haigh's trial was held at Lewes Assizes. Haigh pleaded insanity, claiming that he had drunk the blood of his victims.
He said he had dreams dominated by blood as a young boy. When he was involved in a car accident in March 1944, his dream returned to him: "I saw before me a forest of crucifixes which gradually turned into trees. At first, there appeared to be dew or rain, dripping from the branches, but as I approached I realized it was blood. The whole forest began to writhe and the trees, dark and erect, to ooze blood... A man went from  each tree catching the blood ... When the cup was full, he approached me. 'Drink,' he said, but I was unable to move."

The Attorney-General, Sir Hartley Shawcross KC (later Lord Shawcross), led for the prosecution, and urged the jury to reject Haigh’s defense of insanity because he had acted with malice aforethought.

Sir David Maxwell Fyfe KC, defending, called many witnesses to attest to Haigh’s mental state, including Henry Yellowlees, who claimed Haigh had a paranoid constitution, adding: "The absolute callous, cheerful, bland and almost friendly indifference of the accused to the crimes which he freely admits having committed is unique in my experience."

Haigh apparently had believed (mistakenly) that if the bodies of his victims could not be found, a murder conviction would not be possible. It took only minutes for the jury to find him guilty. Mr Justice Humphreys sentenced him to death. On 10 August 1949 Haigh drank a brandy just before being hanged by executioner Albert Pierrepoint.

The case was one of the post-1945 cases which gained considerable coverage in the newspapers even though Haigh's guilt was not questioned. The editor of the Daily Mirror, Silvester Bolam, was sentenced to a three-month prison term for contempt of court for describing Haigh as a "murderer" while the trial was still underway.

Haigh's confirmed victims 
McSwan family:
William Donald McSwan (9 September 1944)
Donald and Amy McSwan (2 July 1945)
Henderson family:
Archibald and Rosalie Henderson (12 February 1948)
Henrietta Helen Olivia Robarts Durand-Deacon, née Fargus (18 February 1949)

In popular culture 

 The release of the 1949 British film noir Obsession was delayed by the British Board of Film Censors due to similarities in its plot to the Haigh case.
The Haigh case was dramatised in the episode "The Jar of Acid" on the 1951 radio series The Black Museum.
Hide My Eyes by Margery Allingham written in 1958 mirrors the Haigh case though indirectly.
The mid-1960s unproduced Hitchcock project Kaleidoscope had been inspired by Haigh and serial killer Neville Heath.
The role of Haigh was played by Martin Clunes in the ITV drama A Is for Acid.
Nigel Fairs played Haigh in the Big Finish audio drama In Conversation with an Acid Bath Murderer (2011), which he also wrote. The cast included Richard Franklin as Archie Henderson, Mandi Symonds as Olive Durand-Deacon and Louise Jameson (who also directed) as Rose Henderson. It was released as the fourth instalment in their Drama Showcase anthology series.
 For some years, Haigh’s waxwork was exhibited in the "Chamber of Horrors" at Madame Tussauds in London.
 The stage play Under a Red Moon, by Michael Slade, is a fictional account of Haigh's examination by a psychiatrist before his trial.
 Stage play WAX by Micheal Punter is based upon a fictional meeting between Haigh and a woman (Anna), an artist from Madame Tussauds, who models his wax work for exhibition in the 'Chamber of Horrors' while he is in the condemned cell.
 The Criminal Minds episode "Masterpiece" is inspired by Haigh.
 American thrash/death metal/grindcore band Macabre recorded a song about Haigh (from their Murder Metal album) called "Acid Bath Vampire".
 Japanese stoner/doom metal band Church of Misery recorded a song about Haigh entitled "Make Them Die Slowly (John George Haigh)". The track was released on the album And Then There Were None...
 In the video game Clock Tower 3, the enemy Corroder is a "Subordinate" created from the ghost of a serial killer who disposed of his victims in drums filled with acid. The acid he uses to dispose of the two characters he kills on-screen and to attack Alyssa, along with other dialogue in the game, indicate that he is meant to be a version of John Haigh who was turned into a Subordinate. (However, the game gets several details incorrect, such as the time when Haigh committed his murders.)

See also 
List of serial killers in the United Kingdom
Murder conviction without a body
John Martin Scripps, another executed British serial killer and con artist.
Teodoro García Simental, Mexican murderer and drug lord who drowned bodies (perhaps as many as 300) in sodium hydroxide.

References

Bibliography 
 
 
 
 The Times, court reports, 9 and 26 March 1949; 29 July 1949; 19 January 1951.

1909 births
1936 crimes in the United Kingdom
1944 murders in the United Kingdom 
1945 murders in the United Kingdom 
1948 murders in the United Kingdom 
1949 murders in the United Kingdom 
1949 deaths
20th-century English businesspeople
20th-century English criminals
20th-century executions by England and Wales
British people convicted of fraud
British Plymouth Brethren
Confidence tricksters
English evangelicals
English fraudsters
English people convicted of murder
English serial killers
Executed British serial killers
Executed people from Lincolnshire
Fugitives
Male serial killers
Murder convictions without a body
People convicted of murder by England and Wales
People educated at Queen Elizabeth Grammar School, Wakefield
People executed by the United Kingdom by hanging
People from Stamford, Lincolnshire
People from Wakefield